Henry Morris Naglee (January 15, 1815 – March 5, 1886) was a civil engineer, banker, vintner, and a Union General in the American Civil War.

Life and career
Naglee was born in Philadelphia, Pennsylvania, on January 15, 1815. He graduated from the United States Military Academy in 1835 as 23rd in a class of 56 cadets. Posted in the 5th U.S. Infantry he resigned shortly after his graduation and worked as a civil engineer. Naglee came to California in 1846 during the Mexican–American War as captain of Company D of the 1st Regiment of New York Volunteers. Leading a detachment of volunteers to La Paz in Baja California he fought in the Skirmish of Todos Santos where he led 45 mounted soldiers into the Mexican rear, which led to the collapse of their resistance. In the following pursuit he ordered the killing of two captured Mexicans without orders, for which the military governor of Alta California, Colonel Richard B. Mason, ordered Naglee arrested. When President Polk granted a pardon to military and naval offenders acting in wartime, Naglee escaped punishment for this crime.

After his discharge from the army, in 1849, Captain Naglee became the first commanding officer of the 1st California Guards, a California Militia unit in San Francisco, the beginning of what would become the California National Guard. He also entered into a career in banking. In 1858 Naglee left San Francisco to study viticulture in Europe. Later that year, he bought 140 acres (0.570 km2) just east of downtown San Jose, California, where he built an estate and planted vineyards of Riesling and Charbono grapes, from which he distilled brandy. His high-quality brandy and his great viticultural knowledge made him famous as the "Father of California's brandy industry".

In May 1861 Naglee reentered the United States Army as lieutenant colonel of the 16th U.S. Infantry. As the regiment's recruitment took longer and longer Naglee's want for active service made him resign in January 1862. Naglee was made a brigadier general of Volunteers the next month and given command of a brigade in the IV Corps of the Army of the Potomac.  on May 31 and June 1. The division, under command of Gen. Silas Casey, was made up of the greenest troops in the army. During the Peninsula Campaign he fought in the Battle of Fair Oaks on May 31. His brigade and the whole division distinguished themselves when they were attacked, but had to fall back in the end. Naglee himself had his horse killed under him and received four wounds from musket-balls. While both praise and blame were given to the division, and Naglee, he wrote a number of reports and letters, increasing his role in the battle, that sparked great criticism and animosity. Later that year he commanded a brigade and a division in North Carolina, participating in the relief of Washington. In 1863 he commanded the VII Corps and the District of Virginia. In 1864 he was mustered out of the army and returned to San Jose to resume banking and brandy making. He also actively campaigned in the election of General McClellan for the Democratic Party.

In 1865 he married 24 years old Marie Antoinette Ringgold, the daughter of his friend George Hays Ringgold and descendant to President James Monroe. From this marriage were born two daughters, Marie, in 1866, and Antoinette, in 1869. Mrs. Naglee died in 1869 and Naglee never remarried. In California General Naglee was involved in two very public scandals.  In 1865, Mary Schell, whom Naglee had met in 1858 and corresponded with while at war, published his love letters in a book entitled The Love Life of Brigadier General Henry M. Naglee, Consisting of a correspondence on Love, War and Politics, after he broke off their relationship.  In 1877 his nanny Emily Hanks filed a lawsuit against Naglee, claiming he proposed marriage to her and then seduced her.  This led to two trials and three years of headlines in the local newspapers.  The court ruled in Hanks's favor in the first trial, but in Naglee's in the second.

Henry Naglee died on illness in San Francisco on March 5, 1886, and is buried in Laurel Hill Cemetery in Philadelphia. His estate was developed into the residential Naglee Park neighborhood in 1902 by his daughters. They erected a stone and brass memorial to Naglee in San Jose's St. James Park, and Naglee Avenue in San Jose was named after him.

See also

List of American Civil War generals (Union)

Notes

References
 War Department; The War of the Rebellion : a compilation of the official records of the Union and Confederate armies.; Series I, Volume XI, Part 1; Washington, D.C.; 1884
Eicher, John H., & Eicher, David J., Civil War High Commands, Stanford University Press, 2001, .
San Jose Underbelly article about Naglee monument in St. James Park

External links

Guide to the Naglee Family Collection at The Bancroft Library
 

American viticulturists
Union Army generals
American military personnel of the Mexican–American War
United States Military Academy alumni
People from San Jose, California
1815 births
1886 deaths
Military personnel from Philadelphia
People of California in the American Civil War
People of Pennsylvania in the American Civil War
Burials at Laurel Hill Cemetery (Philadelphia)